The Old Lafayette County Courthouse, built 1893–1894, is an historic former courthouse building located on State Road 51 at 136 Fletcher Avenue, North, corner of Bloxham Street in  Mayo, Florida, It was Lafayette County's second courthouse, the first at New Troy having burned down New Year's Eve 1892. It was built on the courthouse square in Mayo but was moved across the street to make way for a fireproof building, the present Lafayette County Courthouse. A two-story verandah was added on 3 sides after it was moved. In 1989, the Old Lafayette County Courthouse was listed in A Guide to Florida's Historic Architecture, published by the University of Florida Press. Today it is an inn called the Chateau.

References

External links
 Florida's Historic Courthouses

County courthouses in Florida
Buildings and structures in Lafayette County, Florida
1894 establishments in Florida
Government buildings completed in 1894
Hotels in Florida